Metalink is an extensible metadata file format that describes one or more computer files available for download. It specifies files appropriate for the user's language and operating system; facilitates file verification and recovery from data corruption; and lists alternate download sources (mirror URIs).

The duplicate download locations provide reliability in case one method fails. Some clients also achieve faster download speeds by allowing different chunks/segments of each file to be downloaded from multiple resources at the same time (segmented downloading).

Metalink supports listing multiple partial and full file hashes along with PGP signatures. Most clients only support verifying MD5, SHA-1, and SHA-256, however. Besides FTP and HTTP mirror locations and rsync, it also supports listing the P2P methods BitTorrent, ed2k, magnet link or any other that uses a URI.

Development history 
Metalink 3.0 was publicly released in 2005. It was designed to aid in downloading Linux ISO images and other large files on release day, when servers would be overloaded (each server would have to be tried manually) and to repair large downloads by replacing only the parts with errors instead of fully re-downloading them. It was initially adopted by download managers, and was used by open source projects such as OpenOffice.org and Linux distributions. A community developed around it, more download programs supported it (including proprietary ones) and it saw commercial adoption. In 2008, the community took their work to the Internet Engineering Task Force which resulted in Metalink 4.0 in 2010, described in a Standards Track RFC. Metalink 3.0 (with the extension ) and Metalink 4.0 (with the extension ) are incompatible because they have a slightly different format. In 2011, another Standards Track RFC described Metalink in HTTP header fields.

Client programs

Client libraries 
 libmetalink (MIT License) is a Metalink library written in C. It provides the parsing of Metalink XML files to programs written in C and uses Expat (library) or libxml2. It does not handle the actual downloading of files. It is used by cURL and other client programs.
 metalink-checker (GPL) is a command line downloader written in Python that supports multi-source downloads and chunk checksums, as well as checking mirrors. It can also be used as a Python library.

In use 
Mandriva Linux has integrated Metalink into package management with urpmi and aria2.
Fedora has integrated Metalink into package management with yum. openSUSE has integrated Metalink into package management with ZYpp and aria2.

Wubi, the Windows-based Ubuntu installer, uses Metadl (LGPL) to download Ubuntu ISO images and takes advantage of Metalink's features of higher availability and increased reliability. If there are errors in the download, they are repaired, instead of restarting the large download.

Appupdater (GPL) for Windows "is similar to apt-get or yum on Linux. It automates the process of installing and maintaining up to date versions of programs."

Currently, OpenOffice.org uses Metalinks to distribute their free office suite. cURL offers Metalinks of their downloads. UniProt Consortium also provides a Metalink for their large protein database. Dofus, a Flash MMORPG uses Metalinks for downloads and so does SageMath, the open-source mathematical software.

The software hosting and collaboration platform Origo generates Metalinks for all hosted releases.

The following Linux distributions use Metalink for ISO image distribution: Adios, Bayanihan Linux, BeleniX, Berry Linux, BLAG Linux and GNU, Bluewhite64 Linux, Damn Small Linux, Fedora, GoboLinux, Granular Linux, KateOS, Linux Mint, openSUSE, Pardus Linux, PCLinuxOS, PuppyLinux, Sabayon Linux, StartCom Enterprise Linux, SUSE Linux, Ubuntu.

The following FreeBSD based distributions use Metalink for ISO image distribution: DesktopBSD, MidnightBSD, and TrueOS.

Metalink client feature comparison 
A guide to which clients support which Metalink features:

No clients support rsync at this time.

Metalink generation 
Metalink is formatted as XML so it can be either hand-crafted or created with an XML library, useful for automation. These tools are specifically for Metalink.
 Bouncer is "database driven mirror management app that has three main components - a bounce script, a sentry script to check mirrors and files for integrity and a set of web-based administration tools." Bouncer supports Metalink via a patch that has not yet been integrated upstream.
 Geo McFly (GPL) is an on the fly generator of metalinks based on the downloader's geographical location, written in Python.
 Metalink Editor (GPL) is a Cross Platform GUI Metalink editor written in Python which allows you to create and edit Metalinks.
 Metalink Library (GPL) is a Cross Platform Metalink library for Python and PHP based on Metalink Editor with many automatic features and an easy command-line interface to generate Metalink and Torrent files.
 Metalink Generator can also be used to create Metalinks by filling out a Web form.
 Metalink tools (GPL) Unix/Windows command line tools for generating Metalinks with hashes and mirror/p2p lists.
 Dynamic online metalinks based on metadata. Automatically created metalinks based on metadata published by each mirror.
 MirrorManager (MIT X11 license) is used by the Fedora Project for dynamically listing mirrors.
 MirrorBrain (GPL, Apache License) is a real-time Metalink generator and download redirector. It can either return Metalinks, or automatically redirect non-Metalink clients (per HTTP redirection) to a mirror server near them. Transparent negotiation of Metalinks, embedding PGP signatures, Metalink/HTTP and other advanced features are supported. It is used for instance by openSUSE and OpenOffice.org.

Example Metalink 4.0 .meta4 file 
Metalink 4.0 files have the extension  and are XML text files. They are served with the application/metalink4+xml Internet media type.

 <?xml version="1.0" encoding="UTF-8"?>
 <metalink xmlns="urn:ietf:params:xml:ns:metalink">
   <published>2009-05-15T12:23:23Z</published>
   <file name="example.ext">
     <size>14471447</size>
     <identity>Example</identity>
     <version>1.0</version>
     <language>en</language>
     <description>
     A description of the example file for download.
     </description>
     <hash type="sha-256">3d6fece8033d146d8611eab4f032df738c8c1283620fd02a1f2bfec6e27d590d</hash>
     <url location="de" priority="1">ftp://ftp.example.com/example.ext</url>
     <url location="fr" priority="1">http://example.com/example.ext</url>
     <metaurl mediatype="torrent" priority="2">http://example.com/example.ext.torrent</metaurl>
   </file>
 </metalink>

Example Metalink/HTTP header fields 
Metalink in HTTP header fields makes use of existing standard HTTP header fields such as ETags, Link header fields (for mirrors and P2P), and Instance Digests (for hashes).

Etag: "thvDyvhfIqlvFe+A9MYgxAfm1q5="
Link: <http://www2.example.com/example.ext>; rel=duplicate
Link: <ftp://ftp.example.com/example.ext>; rel=duplicate
Link: <http://example.com/example.ext.torrent>; rel=describedby; type="application/x-bittorrent"
Link: <http://example.com/example.ext.meta4>; rel=describedby; type="application/metalink4+xml"
Link: <http://example.com/example.ext.asc>; rel=describedby; type="application/pgp-signature"
Digest: SHA-256=MWVkMWQxYTRiMzk5MDQ0MzI3NGU5NDEyZTk5OWY1ZGFmNzgyZTJlODYzYjRjYzFhOTlmNTQwYzI2M2QwM2U2MQ==

Example Metalink 3.0 .metalink file 
Metalink 3.0 files have the extension  and are XML text files.

 <?xml version="1.0" encoding="UTF-8"?>
 <metalink version="3.0" xmlns="http://www.metalinker.org/">
   <files>
     <file name="example.ext">
       <verification>
         <hash type="md5">example-md5-hash</hash>
         <hash type="sha1">example-sha1-hash</hash>
         <signature type="pgp"/>
       </verification>
       <resources>
         <url type="ftp" location="us" preference="90">ftp://ftp.example.com/example.ext</url>
         <url type="ftp" location="uk" preference="90">ftp://ftp.example.net/example.ext</url>
         <url type="http" location="us" preference="90">http://example.com/example.ext</url> 
         <url type="http" location="de" preference="90">http://example.net/example.ext</url>
         <url type="bittorrent" preference="100">http://example.org/example.ext.torrent</url>
         <url type="rsync"/>
         <url type="magnet"/>
         <url type="ed2k"/>
       </resources>
     </file>
   </files>
 </metalink>

See also 
 ed2k URI scheme
 Magnet URI scheme
 Named data networking

References

External links 
 

Distributed data storage
Download managers
Internet Protocol based network software
XML-based standards